"Smile Bitch" (also known as "Smile (Living My Best Life)") is a song by American stand-up comedian Lil Duval, featuring guest vocals by American rappers Snoop Dogg and Ball Greezy, and co-written by Mitchelle’l. It contains a sample of "Curious" by Midnight Star.

Commercial performance
The song debuted at number 83 on the US Billboard Hot 100. Smile serves as both Lil Duval's and Ball Greezy's first Hot 100 entry, Snoop Dogg makes his 41st career visit and adds his first new title since his featured on Kendrick Lamar's "Institutionalized", in April 2015. The single peaked at number 56 on the chart. Smile reached number one on the US R&B/Hip-Hop Airplay, marking Lil Duval's and Ball Greezy's first number-one, and Snoop's second.

Charts

Weekly charts

Year-end charts

Certifications

References

2018 singles
2018 songs
Snoop Dogg songs
Songs written by Snoop Dogg
G-funk songs
Empire Distribution singles